Natalia Juárez Zenteno (born February 13, 1995, Mexico City, Distrito Federal, Mexico), is a Mexican actress known for her character "Simoneta" in the child soap opera ¡Vivan los niños!.

Filmography

References

External links 
 

1995 births
Living people
Mexican child actresses
Mexican telenovela actresses
Mexican television actresses
Actresses from Mexico City
21st-century Mexican actresses